London Buses route 11 is a Transport for London contracted bus route in London, England. Running between Fulham Broadway and Liverpool Street, it is operated by London General.

History

Route 11 was introduced by the London General Omnibus Company in August 1906, and is amongst the oldest routes to have operated continuously in London, although its route has changed on several occasions. It was the first route operated by London Road-Car Co Ltd, running from Victoria to Hammersmith via Chelsea. From 1916, LGOC B-type buses allocated to Old Kent Road garage were used until 1924, when it was allocated to Kingston garage.

On 5 August 1922, Leyland LB (London Bus) type buses were introduced on route 11 by Arthur George Partridge and Christopher Dodson Ltd with chocolate livery and the fleet name "Express". The first AEC NS-Type buses entered service on route 11 in May 1923. On 5 September 1932, Q1 buses were used on this route which operated from Liverpool Street to Shepherd's Bush.

In May 1949, Leyland Titan RTW buses were introduced on route 11. AEC Regent III RT buses were in service on route 11 in the 1950s. On 12 June 1959, the fourth AEC Routemaster in passenger service (RM14), entered service on route 11 from Riverside garage.

The route starts at Fulham Broadway and operates via the West End and some of London's most famous landmarks to Liverpool Street bus station. The journey from the top deck is a cheap means of sightseeing in London. It previously ran to Hammersmith until being replaced west of Fulham Broadway on 17 July 1993 by route 211.

In October 1996, London General buses operating on route 11 from its Waterloo garage switched to City Diesel.

On 4 June 2002, Queen Elizabeth II's Golden Jubilee, the Metropolitan Police flagged down a Number 11 bus and used it as temporary transport for twenty-three peaceful anti-royalty demonstrators whom they had arrested after the demonstration, most of them in a nearby pub. The bus was used to take the protestors to various police stations for questioning. The protesters sued the police, and the Met settled out of court with an apology, an admission of unlawful detention, and a payment of £3,500 to each protester.

The route has a cameo appearance in the 2006 film The Da Vinci Code, where the protagonists take a number 11 bus from near Temple Church to get to "Chelsea Library", though they get off at Westminster Abbey; this is the same route the bus takes in real life.

London General has successfully retained route 11 with new contracts starting on 30 October 2010 and 31 October 2015.

New Routemasters were introduced on 21 September 2013. In September 2016, conductors were removed from buses on route 11 and buses now operate with drivers only and the rear platform closed.

In 2021, the frequency of the service was reduced from six buses per hour to five on Monday to Sunday daytimes.

On 23 November 2022, it was announced that route 11 would be rerouted to run to Waterloo instead of Liverpool Street, following a consultation that proposed that it would be withdrawn and replaced with routes 26 and 507. This change will be implemented by the end of 2023.

Current route
Route 11 operates via these primary locations:
Fulham Broadway station 
King's Road
Sloane Square station 
Victoria Coach Station 
Victoria bus station  for Victoria station  
Westminster City Hall
St James's Park station 
Westminster station 
Trafalgar Square
Charing Cross station  
Aldwych
St Paul's Churchyard
Bank Station 
Liverpool Street Station    

The bus route passes many tourist attractions including:

It also goes near the Royal Courts of Justice, St Clement Danes, Aldwych Underground station, High Commission of Australia, Savoy Hotel, Nelson's Column, Admiralty Arch, Big Ben, Palace of Westminster and New Scotland Yard. The Daily Telegraph called the route one of the "best routes for sightseeing on a shoestring". There is an e-book tour guide indicating the points of interest along the number 11 bus route and detailing connecting buses to other London tourist attractions.

References

External links

Timetable

Bus routes in London
Transport in the London Borough of Hammersmith and Fulham
Transport in the Royal Borough of Kensington and Chelsea
Transport in the City of London
Transport in the City of Westminster